54 km is a rural locality (a passing loop) in Poperechenskoye Rural Settlement of Yurginsky District, Russia. The population was 39 as of 2012.

Geography 
The passing loop is located on the Yurga-Tashtagol line, 44 km south of Yurga (the district's administrative centre) by road. Poperechnoye is the nearest rural locality.

Streets 
 Vokzalnaya
 Dorozhnaya

References 

Rural localities in Kemerovo Oblast